Archibald Lynn McQuilken (30 September 1933 – 16 October 1985) was an Irish first-class cricketer.

McQuilken was born at Muckamore in County Antrim in September 1933. An all-rounder for Muckamore Cricket Club, for whom he scored over 10,000 runs and took over a 1,000 wickets, he played two first-class cricket matches for Ireland 1962. His first came against the Combined Services at Belfast, while his second match came against Scotland at Greenock. He took a five-wicket haul on debut, with 5/37; these were his only first-class wickets. He also scored 140 runs across both matches, with a highest score of 42. Outside of cricket his profession was an engineer. He died in a road traffic accident in Belfast in June 1985.

References

External links

1933 births
1985 deaths
People from County Antrim
Cricketers from Northern Ireland
Irish cricketers
Road incident deaths in Northern Ireland